Krachia guernei is a species of sea snail, a gastropod in the family Cerithiopsidae, which is known from European waters. It was described by Dautzenberg and Fischer H., in 1896.

References

 Dautzenberg P. & Fischer H., 1896: Dragages effectués par l'Hirondelle et par la Princesse Alice 1888-1895. 1. Mollusques Gastropodes; Mémoires de la Société Zoologique de France 9: 395-498, pl. 15-22
 Bouchet P. & Warén A. (1993). Revision of the Northeast Atlantic bathyal and abyssal Mesogastropoda. Bollettino Malacologico supplemento 3: 579-840

Cerithiopsidae
Gastropods described in 1896